{{DISPLAYTITLE:gc (engineering)}}

In engineering and physics, gc is a unit conversion factor used to convert mass to force or vice versa. It is defined as

In unit systems where force is a derived unit, like in SI units, gc is equal to 1. In unit systems where force is a primary unit, like in imperial and US customary measurement systems, gc may or may not equal 1 depending on the units used, and value other than 1 may be required to obtain correct results. For example, in the kinetic energy (KE) formula, if gc = 1 is used, then KE is expressed in foot-poundals; but if gc = 32.174 is used, then KE is expressed in foot-pounds.

Motivations
According to Newton's second law, the force F is proportional to the product of mass m and acceleration a:

or

If F = 1 lbf, m = 1 lb, and a = , then

Leading to

gc is defined as the reciprocal of the constant K

or equivalently, as

Specific systems of units

References

Equations